John Juzek (né Janek Jůzek, aka Jan, aka Johann;1892, Písek – c. 1965, Luby) was a Czech merchant, widely known in North America as an exporter of violins, violas, cellos, and double basses made and labeled under his anglicized name, "John Juzek," crafted mostly by guilds and various independent makers in the Bohemia region of the Czechoslovakia and Germany border.

The John Juzek trademark, brand, and line of orchestral string instruments endures today through the original -year-old family-owned wholesaler, Metropolitan Music Co., currently owned and managed by the heirs of Robert Juzek (1894–1975), a founding partner and sibling of John Juzek.

The string instruments
 Labels
The John Juzek imprint on the labels inside the F-holes reflect an import-to-the-U.S trade name, not the craftsman. The city and country imprint reflects the location of Juzek's shops, mostly in Prague before World War II. From 1920 through the 1970s, the craftsmen were from the Bohemia region on both sides of the German-Czechoslovak border. Extant instruments from the 1920s have labels reading "Jan Juzek," the Czech version of his given name, yet other parts of the label, "Violin Maker in Prague," are spelled in English.

 Label colors
Black labels indicate that the instrument was made by an outside vendor. Multicolored labels were used for violins.

 Instruments
Janek Juzek, himself, was a violin maker, and crafted instruments in his own shop in Prague sometime between 1910 and 1920, using wood from torn down houses and churches, when he could find it, otherwise from the Carpathian Mountains, which formed the eastern border of Czechoslovakia. For the Master Art series, Juzek adopted standard patterns of classic violin lutheirs, including:
 Stradivarius
 Guarnerius: Guarnerian outline, soundholes slightly elongated; Stradivarian scroll
 Nicolò Gagliano
 Guadagnini
 Testore
 Maggini

As demand for string instruments in North America]increased, John Juzek purchased violins violas, cellos, and double bases from craftsmen, mostly from Schönbach, and, according to advertising literature of Czechoslovak to build instruments fitting his specifications.

 Manufacturing and export
In the early 1900s, John Juzek ran a factory in Schönbach, Bohemia (renamed Luby in 1946), where the John Juzek labeled instruments were crafted. Juzek also was the export merchant for independent craftsmen, for whom the instruments were also labeled with the John Juzek name.

 Export and distribution
The instruments were sold in North America, mostly in the New York City area, exclusively through Metropolitan Music Co. (originally named Czechoslovak Musical Instruments Company), a New York City firm founded in 1920 by Robert J. Juzek (1894–1975) Robert's four brothers were involved in the business in various capacities:
 John Juzek
 William Juzek (1905–1942)
 Jerry Juzek (né Jaromir Juzek; 1901–1991)
 Charles Juzek (né Karel Juzek; 1896–1979)

Before the founding of Czechoslovak Musical Instruments Company, Robert Juzek had traveled to New York aboard the SS Imperator, arriving March 2, 1920, as a secretary for the Czecho Slovak Commercial Corp., located at 59 Pearl Street, New York City, a Czechoslovak exporter of orchestral instruments.

By the 1930s, the Czechoslovak Musical Instruments Company in New York City was selling violins, violas, cellos, double basses, mandolins, banjo mandolins, ukuleles, banjo ukuleles, tenor ukuleles, tiples, banjos, tenor banjos, and guitars.

After World War II ended, John Juzek no longer was connected with Metropolitan Music Co. Robert Juzek began making all the contracts directly with the shops. When Robert Juzek died in 1975, his son, Bob Juzek (né Robert Juzek; born 1938) became the president. Metropolitan Music Co. is now managed by Bob's two sons, Rob and Adam, the third generation family of the founder. The current John Juzek string instruments are made in Europe and China.

Metropolitan Music Co.
 Robert Juzek — USA
 Czechoslovak Musical Instruments Company
 1920 to about 1932
 1342 Second Avenue (between 70th & 71st Streets), New York City
 1932 to about 1937
 Metropolitan Music Co.
 1358 First Avenue (between 72nd & 73 Streets), New York City
 (name change occurred after to the move, before 1935)
 1937 to 1974
 222 Fourth Avenue (between 32nd & 33rd Streets), New York City
 1974 to 1977
 Westwood, New Jersey
 1977 to present
 Stowe, Vermont

Metropolitan Music Co. hired and sponsored several immigrant luthiers, including:
 Alfons Frantisek Vavra (born 1936) — immigrated from Schönbach to the United States in 1968.
 Peter Eibert (1926–2013) — trained by Heinrich Lang in Nuremberg from the age of 14; he moved to New York in the 1960s to work for the Juzek Family; Eibert is a Master Violin and Bow maker as well as a restorer of Violin Family Instruments; he currently has a violin shop in Garnerville, New York
 John Sipko (born 1953) — worked for the Juzek family, then later worked for Jack Loeb at Ideal Instrument Co. Inc.

Publications of Metropolitan Music Co.
 Books
 The Simplicity of Violin Playing, by Robert Juzek, Metropolitan Music Co.
 Book 1 (©1948) 
 Book 2 (©1950) 
 All violin technique: complete method for all violinists, from beginning to highest artistic perfection, by Robert Juzek, Metropolitan Music Co. (©1951) 
 Professional hints on repair, Metropolitan Music Co. (©1948) 
 Catalogs
 Czechoslovak Musical Instruments Co. (1920)
 32 pages of violins, bows, parts, strings, etc. 
 Czechoslovak Music Co., Delux hardbound catalog (1931)
 166 pages; includes Eugene Ormandy violin testimonial
 Czechoslovak Musical Instruments Co. (1931)
 161 pages; lacking pps. 51–52, 97–98, 127–130, and 143–144; printed by J. Schmidt, Markneukirchen, Saxony; features the "famous John Juzek Hand made violins", also Koehler woodwind instruments, plucked strings, percussion instruments, etc.
 Metropolitan Music Co. Musical Merchandise: Wholesale Catalogue No. 10, (1935) Smithsonian #45 
  210 pages, 9.5 by 12 inches.; black and white, and color illustrations; includes illustrations of violins, accordions, guitars, banjos, ukuleles, mandolins, clarinets, drums, bassoons, whistles, cellos, clarinets, English horns, French horns, harmonicas, clarinets, oboes, piccolos, pitch pipes, saxophones, sousaphones, trombones, trumpets, violins, and zithers; features bowed stringed instruments made by John Juzek of Prague
 Metropolitan Music Co. Catalogue No. 19. (1960), Smithsonian #221

Notable musicians who own John Juzek instruments
 Jazz
 Reid Anderson, double bass (circa 1930s)
 Lisle Atkinson, double bass
 John Patitucci, double bass (circa 1935; Czechoslovakia)
 Jay Hungerford, double bass
 Ron Carter, double bass
 David Ephross, double bass
 Christian McBride, double bass
 Steve Bailey, double bass
 Keith DeStafano, 1920s double bass
 Shanir Ezra Blumenkranz, double bass, 1962 Juzek 5-string with low B
 Mark Helias, double bass, 1930 Juzek
 Avery Sharpe, double bass
 Leon Lee Dorsey, double bass, circa 1910s
 David Finck, double bass
 Kenny Davis, double bass
 Ari Roland, double bass
 Mikel Combs, (circa 1920; Czechoslovakia)
 Lynn Seaton, double bass
 F Raymond Hauver, double bass
 Buster Williams, double bass

 Bluegrass
 Viktor Krauss, double bass (1948; Prague)
 Todd Phillips
The Finer violin cornered basses with Juzek labels were made by the Wilfer family: Anton Wilfer (1901–1976) (pre-WWII), Wenzl B. Wilfer (post-WWII thru the 1970s) — and now Emanuel Wilfer. They were first made in Czechoslovakia; but after WWII, they moved across over the border to Germany. The Gamba shaped basses as well as the plywood basses were supplied by the Benedict Lang I shop in Schönbach pre-World War II and B. Lang II in Mittenwald post-World War II.

Some of the Master Art Copy violins and cellos imprinted with higher numbers dated in the 1950s and 1960s were made by Roman Teller (died 1974), who moved to Erlangen, West Germany after World War II.

Juzek family
John Juzek managed the production and export of Bohemian crafted string instruments to New York City in the aftermath of World War I, through duress of the Great Depression of the early 1930s, the subsequent Nazi occupation that began in 1939, and World War II.

John Juzek and his five siblings were born in Písek (now in the Czech Republic). In 1921, Jan Juzek was single and resided in Písek. In 1930, he was married to Ella (born 1909 in Písek) and together they lived in Schönbach. In 1936, he was living in Kolín.

References

General references

Inline citations

Czechoslovak luthiers
People from Písek
1892 births
20th-century Czech businesspeople
1965 deaths